The following elections occurred in the year 1825.

North America

United States
 1824 United States House of Representatives elections
 United States Senate election in New York, 1825/1826

See also
 :Category:1825 elections

1825
Elections